The bombing of the Bezuidenhout took place on 3 March 1945, when the Royal Air Force mistakenly bombed the Bezuidenhout neighbourhood in the Dutch city of The Hague.

Bombing
On the morning of 3 March 1945, medium and light bombers of the North American B-25 Mitchell and Douglas Boston types from No. 137 and No. 139 wings of the Second Tactical Air Force took off from Melsbroek near Brussels and Vitry in Northern France.

The British bombers were intended to bomb the Haagse Bos ("Forest of the Hague") district where the Germans had installed V-2 launching facilities that had been used to attack English cities. However, the pilots were issued with the wrong coordinates so the navigational instruments of the bombers had been set incorrectly, and combined with fog and clouds which obscured their vision, the bombs were instead dropped on the Bezuidenhout residential neighbourhood.

Between 8 and 9 o'clock in the morning the bombers dropped 67 tonnes of high explosive bombs on the Bezuidenhout, wreaking widespread destruction. At the time, the neighbourhood was more densely populated than usual with evacuees from The Hague and Wassenaar; tens of thousands were left homeless and had to be quartered in the Eastern and Central Netherlands.

Response
Due to insufficient fire engines and firemen (as many of them had been either called up for forced labour in German industry or had gone into hiding to prevent being signed up) the resulting fire was largely unchecked, killing 511 people, including eight firemen.

As soon as the British realized the extent of the damage, they dropped fliers over the neighbourhood apologizing for the error. Trouw, the Dutch resistance newspaper, reported:

The horrors of the war are increasing. We have seen the fires in The Hague after the terrible bombings due to the V2-launching sites. We have seen the column of smoke, drifting to the south and the ordeal of the war has descended upon us in its extended impact. We heard the screaming bombs falling on (the) Bezuidenhout, and the missiles which brought death and misery fell only a hundred metres from us. At the same time we saw the launching and the roaring, flaming V2, holding our breath to see if the launch was successful, if not falling back on the homes of innocent people. It is horrible to see the monsters take off in the middle of the night between the houses, lighting up the skies. One can imagine the terrors that came upon us now that The Hague is a frontline town, bombed continuously for more than ten days. Buildings, burning and smouldering furiously, a town choking from smoke, women and children fleeing, men hauling furniture which they tried to rescue from the chaos. What misery, what distress.

Commemoration

The bombing is commemorated every year on the first Sunday after 3 March. In 2011, Mayor Jozias van Aartsen of The Hague as well as the Mayors of Wassenaar and Leidschendam-Voorburg (residents of both towns helped with firefighting and caring for the survivors) were present at the remembrance ceremony, which consisted of a church service, the laying of a wreath at the Monument of the human mistake and a remembrance concert in the Royal Conservatory of The Hague. A similar church service and concert were held in 2012.

Statistics
As a result of the bombing, there were:
511 fatalities
344 wounded
20,000 people left homeless
3,250 burned out residences
3,241 damaged residences
391 irreparably damaged residences
290 destroyed businesses
5 destroyed churches
9 destroyed schools
10 destroyed public buildings

Gallery

References

Further reading
(in Dutch) Carlo Tinschert, Boodschap aan de bevolking van Den Haag – Oorzaken, gevolgen en nasleep van het mislukte bombardement op het Bezuidenhout, 3 maart 1945, Sdu Uitgevers, The Hague 

1945 in the Netherlands
Aerial bombing operations and battles
Aerial operations and battles of World War II involving the United Kingdom
History of The Hague
March 1945 events
Netherlands in World War II
Netherlands–United Kingdom military relations
20th century in The Hague
V-weapons
Bezuidenhout
Aerial operations and battles of World War II by town or city